Viking Destiny (also known as Of Gods And Warriors) is a 2018 film directed by David L.G. Hughes. The film was released on October 5, 2018 by Fatal Black and Saban Films.

Plot
A Viking Princess (Demetriou) is forced to flee her kingdom after being framed for the murder of her father the King. Under the guidance of the god Odin, Terence Stamp, she travels the world gaining wisdom and building the army she needs to win back her throne.

Production
Filmed between 8 June and 12 July 2017 at Leslie Hill, Red Hall, Ballycarry, and O'Harabrook House near Ballymoney in Northern Ireland.

Critical reception
The film was largely negatively received by reviewers. The Guardians Cath Clarke described it as "fantastically wooden and dodgily acted" and Jeannette Catsoulis of The New York Times summed it up as "low-budget Nordic nonsense". In contrast James Hanton of Starburst (magazine) asserted that, of the Viking movies in circulation, "this one punches above its weight in comparison to many" and Flash Bang Film Review commented that it "delivers a very high standard of action in front of the camera and strong filmatism behind it.".

Cast
 Anna Demetriou as Princess Helle of Volsung
 Terence Stamp as Odin
 Murray McArthur as Loki
 Will Mellor as Lord Soini
 Paul Freeman as Tarburn
 Ian Beattie as Kirkwood
 Andrew Whipp as King Asmund of Volsung 
 Timo Nieminen as Prince Bard of Volsung
 Martyn Ford as Torstein / Steiner
 Victoria Broom as Queen Alva of Volsung
 Laurence O'Fuarain as Vern
 Kajsa Mohammar as Tait

Released
In 2018, the film was released on DVD in the United States (Region 1 format) and streamed on Netflix in 2019.

References

External links
 

British fantasy films
2018 films
2010s English-language films
2010s British films